Coomalie may refer to.

Coomalie Shire, a local government area in the Northern Territory of Australia
Coomalie pin, a common name for the damselfly species, Eurysticta coomalie

See also
Coomalie Creek, Northern Territory
Coomalie Creek Airfield